Batavia Veterans Administration Hospital is a historic hospital  and national historic district located at Batavia in Genesee County, New York.  The district includes 15 contributing buildings, 1 contributing site, 1 contributing structure, and 3 contributing objects.  They were built or utilized during the period 1932 to 1950. The Veterans Administration opened the facility in 1934, as a regional veteran's hospital. It was later converted to a tuberculosis sanitarium. The original hospital buildings built in 1932 include the main building, kitchen / dining hall / attendant's quarters, recreation building, nurses' quarters, manager's quarters, officer's duplex quarters, laundry, storehouse, boiler house, transformer and animal house, station garage, and the sewage pump house.  The administration building was added in 1939. The buildings are constructed of brick and feature decorative elements reflective of the Colonial Revival and Classical Revival styles.

It was added to the National Register of Historic Places in 2012.

References

External links
VA Western New York Healthcare System

Hospitals in New York (state)

Hospital buildings completed in 1932
Government buildings completed in 1932
Hospital buildings on the National Register of Historic Places in New York (state)
Historic districts on the National Register of Historic Places in New York (state)
Neoclassical architecture in New York (state)
Colonial Revival architecture in New York (state)
Buildings and structures in Genesee County, New York
Veterans Affairs medical facilities
National Register of Historic Places in Genesee County, New York